John Nairn Primrose (born 28 May 1942) is a Canadian trap shooter who competed at six Olympics from 1968 to 1992 (excluding 1980). His best position was seventh in the Mixed Trap in the 1972 and 1976 Olympics. John won a gold medal in the 1975 Trap World Championships and 1983 World Championships (see "Olympic Trap"). A high-light was winning the gold medal at the Commonwealth Games in Edmonton in 1978. He was inducted into the Alberta Sports Hall of Fame after winning his first Commonwealth gold medal in New Zealand.

John, a member of Clan Primrose, is the son of Justice Neil Primrose and the grandson of a lieutenant governor of Alberta, Philip Primrose.

He is one of only fifteen shooters to compete at six Olympic Games.

In 1985, he was made a Member of the Order of Canada.

See also
 List of athletes with the most appearances at Olympic Games

References

External links
Sports-Reference Profile

1942 births
Living people
Canadian male sport shooters
Members of the Order of Canada
Olympic shooters of Canada
Trap and double trap shooters
Shooters at the 1968 Summer Olympics
Shooters at the 1972 Summer Olympics
Shooters at the 1976 Summer Olympics
Shooters at the 1984 Summer Olympics
Shooters at the 1988 Summer Olympics
Shooters at the 1992 Summer Olympics
Sportspeople from Ottawa
John
Commonwealth Games medallists in shooting
Commonwealth Games gold medallists for Canada
Shooters at the 1974 British Commonwealth Games
Shooters at the 1978 Commonwealth Games
Shooters at the 1982 Commonwealth Games
Shooters at the 1986 Commonwealth Games
Shooters at the 1990 Commonwealth Games
Pan American Games medalists in shooting
Pan American Games silver medalists for Canada
Pan American Games bronze medalists for Canada
Shooters at the 1975 Pan American Games
Shooters at the 1979 Pan American Games
Shooters at the 1987 Pan American Games
Shooters at the 1995 Pan American Games
20th-century Canadian people
Medallists at the 1974 British Commonwealth Games
Medallists at the 1978 Commonwealth Games